Pio IX is the easternmost city in the Brazilian state of Piauí. The city is named after Pope Pius IX.

References 

Populated places established in 1939
Municipalities in Piauí
1939 establishments in Brazil